Corps of Engineers may refer to:

Military units
 Canadian Military Engineers, also known as the Corps of Royal Canadian Engineers 
 Corps of Engineers (Ireland)
 Corps of Royal Engineers
 Indian Army Corps of Engineers
 Pakistan Army Corps of Engineers
 United States Army Corps of Engineers

Other uses
 Corps of Engineers (Star Trek), a 2000–2010 Star Trek novel series

See also
 Engineer Corps (disambiguation)